Chen Sisi (born 28 December 1976) is a Chinese singer, philanthropist, and politician. Chen is a member of Chinese Communist Party and vice-president of the People's Liberation Army Second Artillery Corps Song and Dance Troupe. She holds the rank of Senior Colonel in the People's Liberation Army, was a member of 10th National People's Congress, and a Standing Committee member of the All-China Youth Federation.

Chen is the first singer from mainland China to play a personal concert in Taiwan.

Biography
Chen was born in Changde, Hunan in 1976, with her ancestral home in Nanjing, Jiangsu. Chen's secondary education was held at Changde No.7 High School. Chen enrolled at Huaihua University in 1990, and at Hunan Normal University five years later in 1995, before she studied at People's Liberation Army Arts College and China Conservatory of Music.

Chen joined the People's Liberation Army Second Artillery Corps Song and Dance Troupe in 1999; as of 2012, she was the vice-president of the People's Liberation Army Second Artillery Corps Song and Dance Troupe.

In 2009, Chen played a personal concert in Taiwan.

Works

Television

Studio albums
 My Boyfriend is going to South China
 Chinese Girl
 Liusanjie
 You Really Touched Me
 Have a Good Time Together
 Nice Time

Awards
 Golden Eagle Award (2005)

References

External links

1976 births
People from Changde
Huaihua University alumni
Hunan Normal University alumni
People's Liberation Army Arts College alumni
China Conservatory of Music alumni
Living people
Singers from Hunan
21st-century Chinese women singers